Yebra may refer to:

People
 Igor Yebra (born 1974), Spanish ballet dancer
 Óscar Yebra (born 1974), Spanish basketball player
 Valentín García Yebra (1917–2010), Spanish philologist

Places
 Yebra, Guadalajara, Spain
 , Spain
 Yebra de Basa, Spain

Other
 Yebra (crater)